Cabrillo Beach is a historic public beach located in San Pedro, Los Angeles, California. It is named after Juan Rodríguez Cabrillo, a Portuguese explorer who was the first to sail up the California coast.
Cabrillo has two separate beach areas.

History 
Cabrillo Beach is a historic beach situated within the small coastal community of San Pedro. Cabrillo Beach is named after Juan Rodriguez Cabrillo, who was the first European to sail along the coast of California. The city of San Pedro was in consideration of being the host of a major port in Southern California. After much deliberation, the federal government selected San Pedro. Construction of the San Pedro Breakwater began in 1899 for the purpose of protecting San Pedro Bay and the new, major port. However, due to many problems and set-backs, rocks from Chatsworth, California were transported to San Pedro for the construction of the breakwater. In 1913, Angel’s Gate Lighthouse was built at the end of the breakwater, which was, and still is today, the main entrance to the Port of Los Angeles.

The ocean water traveled right up to the cliffs; there was no sand between the cliffs of San Pedro and the ocean. So after completion of the breakwater, sand was added in 1927 in order to create the outer beach. The addition of sand was from the harbor dredging.  As a result of the addition of sand, the expansive outer beach of Cabrillo was created.  Cabrillo Beach opened in 1928, and residents of San Pedro, Wilmington, and Los Angeles flooded to it to enjoy the new Southern California beach.  The San Pedro city leaders were excited to have a newly added destination for visitors and residents to enjoy in San Pedro.

Location 

The beach is on both sides of the eastern point of the Palos Verdes Peninsula. The inner beach is located within the breakwater where the water is calm. The outer beach is located on the outside of the breakwater, which is where one would find the ocean surf.

Cabrillo Beach Complex 
The Cabrillo Marine Aquarium is a major complex of Cabrillo Beach. Situated within the parking lot, the aquarium has been teaching the public about the coast and its marine life for over 75 years. An emphasis on education is the main reason for Cabrillo Marine Aquarium’s longevity and success. The aquarium has over 90 employees, some full-time and most part-time. The employees are either professional educators, marine biologists, or caretakers for the animals. Along with employees, the aquarium also has 350 volunteers that help aid the aquarium’s mission of educating the public and fostering an appreciation of the marine life through special events, monthly coastal clean-ups, and tours.

Overlooking the Los Angeles Harbor is the Cabrillo Beach Fishing Pier.  Built in 1969 inside the breakwater, the pier runs  parallel with the breakwater.  Biking and fishing on the pier is allowed and neither require a license.  There is a cover area for shade and washing stations for cleaning up after fishing.

With the pier on the inner beach, the bathhouse is on the outer beach.  Originally built in 1932, the bathhouse was declared a historic landmark in 1989 as it was one of the last bathhouses built in Southern California.  In the Twentieth century, the bathhouse was a place for people to rent beach gear, such as towels and swimsuits, and boats.  Overall, the bathhouse offered activities for people to enjoy the inner beach of Cabrillo.  The  building was restored on October 12, 2002, and kept its Mediterranean-style structure.  Today, the bathhouse has shower rooms, restrooms, life guard facilities, a snack bar, and a community meeting room upstairs.

Just northeast of the bathhouse, across the parking lot, there is the Cabrillo Beach Youth Waterfront Sports Center, which was established in 1946.  This complex is an aquatic center for the Southern California youth that exposes them to water safety, rescue methods, care and use of equipment, and physical fitness.  Through these activities, the youth develop self-confidence and leadership skills.  One company that offer services at this center is Captain Kirk’s, which offer wind surfing lessons and rentals for the youth.  About 20,000 young people go through the Cabrillo Beach Youth Waterfront Sports Center each year.

Lifeguards 
Los Angeles City Lifeguards and Los Angeles County Lifeguards are responsible for the beach and ocean safety in and around the Cabrillo Beach area.

Water sports 
Cabrillo Beach is a popular destination for those interested in water sports, such as swimming, windsurfing, kitesurfing, kayaking and scuba diving.

Cabrillo Beach is known to "Turn-of-the-Century Sailors" and windsurfers alike as "Hurricane Gulch" because of its predictably strong westerly winds.

Landmarks 
It is also home to a few famous landmarks, namely the  Los Angeles Breakwater which ends at the Angel's Gate Lighthouse, the recently restored Cabrillo Beach Bathhouse, and the Cabrillo Marine Aquarium. The Angels Gate Lighthouse is home to the annual Angel's Gate Lighthouse Swim competition, held by lifeguards and San Pedro residents each summer.

References

External links

 
 

Beaches of Los Angeles County, California
San Pedro, Los Angeles
Parks in Los Angeles
Geography of Los Angeles
History of Los Angeles
Beaches of Southern California